The ABB LEAF Awards is an annual international architectural prize. It recognises innovative architectural design that sets the benchmark for the international architectural community of the next generation. 

The LEAF Awards program is operated by the Leading European Architects Forum (LEAF), founded in 2001. LEAF brings together leading international architects and designers operating in Europe and beyond to share knowledge, to network and to develop new partnerships.

Entry is open to all architects worldwide and buildings located anywhere in the world and completed between January 2010 and May 2011 are eligible for LEAF Awards 2011.

It’s been hosted on five occasions by the BBC presenter Rick Kelsey.

Categories
LEAF Awards 2015 will consist of the following thirteen categories and the Overall Winner:

 Mixed – Use Building of the year
 Residential Building of the year - Single and Multiple Occupancy
 International Interior Design Award
 Commercial Building of the year
 Hospitality Building of the Year
 Refurbishment of the year
 Public Building of the year
 Best Sustainable Development
 Best Future Building
 Urban Design
 Best Façade Design & Engineering 
 Developer of the Year 
 Lifetime Achievement of the Year

LEAF Awards 2011 consisted of the following twelve categories and the Overall Winner:

 Residential Building of the Year (single occupancy)
 Residential Building of the Year (multiple occupancy)
 Commercial Building of the Year
 Public Building of the Year
 Mixed-Use Building of the Year
 International Residential Interior Design Award
 International Commercial/Public Interior Design Award
 International Offsite Construction Project of the Year
 Best Structural Design of the Year
 Young Architect of the Year
 Best Sustainable Technology Incorporated into a Building
 Best Sustainable Development in keeping with its Environment

Venues
The location of the award ceremony changes from year to year.
 2006: 3rd annual LEAF Awards, Marriott Hotel in Dubai
2007: 4th annual LEAF Awards, Hilton Cavalieri in Rome
 2008: 5th annual LEAF Awards, Dorchester Hotel London (host: Laurence Llewelyn-Bowen)
 2009: 6th annual LEAF Awards, Ritz-Carlton Hotel, Berlin
 2010: 7th annual LEAF Awards, InterContinental London Park Lane, London on 10 September 2010 
 2011: 8th annual LEAF Awards, Landmark Hotel London on 16 September 2011 
 2014: LEAF Awards, Swissotel Düsseldorf on 10 October 2014 
 2015: LEAF Awards, London

Overall winners

Category winners

2019
The category winners in 2019 were:
 Lifetime Achievement Award: Diller Scofidio + Renfro
 Best Arts and Culture Building Project: OPEN Architecture, ‘UCCA Dune Art Museum’, Qinhuangdao, China
 Best New Start Up Practice Project: Nathanael Dorent and Lily Jencks, ‘Ruins Studio’, Dumfries, Scotland, UK
 Best Tall Building Project: Zaha Hadid Architects, ‘Nanjing International Youth Cultural Centre’, Nanjing, China
 Best Regenerative Impact Project: Marcy Wong Donn Logan Architects, ‘Ford Point Revitalization’, Richmond, California US
 Best Mixed Use Building Project: West-line Studio, ‘Up to the Mountain and Down to the River’, Fuxing Town, China
 Best Residential Building Project – Single Occupancy – Sponsored by Laufen: Fujiwara Muro Architects, ‘House in Toyonaka’, Osaka, Japan
 Best Residential Building Project – Multiple Occupancy – Sponsored by Laufen: Skidmore, Owings & Merrill, ‘Manhattan Loft Gardens (The Stratford)’, London, UK
 Best Interior Design Project: Design Studio MAOOM, ‘Coffee Nap Roasters 2nd’, Seoul, Korea
 Best Commercial Building Project: TCHOBAN VOSS Architects, ‘Große Bleichen 19’, Hamburg, Germany
 Best Hospitality Building Project: STUDIO QI, ‘Annso Hill’, Tengchong, China
 Best Refurbishment Project: Marcy Wong Donn Logan Architects, ‘Uber Advanced Technologies Group R&D Center’, San Francisco, California US
 Best Public Building Project: Andrew Bromberg at Aedas, ‘Hong Kong West Kowloon Station’, Hong Kong
 Best Achievement in Environmental Performance Project: LUO studio, ‘Longfu Life Experience Centre’, Puyang County, China
 Best Future Building Under Construction Project: ODA New York, ‘Postkantoor’, Rotterdam, The Netherlands
 Best Urban Design Project: MOZHAO ARCHITECTS, ‘Zishe·Planting Pavilion and Planting Terrace’, Shenzhen, China
 Best Façade Design and Engineering Project – Sponsored by Inox-Color: Marcy Wong Donn Logan Architects, ‘Center Street Parking Garage’, Berkeley, California US

2015
The category winners in 2015 were:
 Residential Building of the Year – Single Occupancy: Architect Robby Cantarutti/ Project: Riverside Cabin
 Mixed – Use Building of the Year: Kavellaris Urban Design KUD/ Project: 2 girls Building
 Residential Building of the Year – Multiple Occupancy: Studio MK27/ Project: V_Itaim
 International Interior Design Award of the Year: Innocad/ Project: HQ ÖBB
 Commercial Building of the Year: LAN Architecture/ Project: Euravenir Tower
 Hospitality Building of the Year: Hiroshi Nakamura & NAP co. Ltd/ Project: Ribbon Chapel
 Refurbishment of the Year: Nikken Space Design LTD/ Project: ANA Crowne Plaza Hotel, Hiroshima Chapel
 Public Building of the Year: Tabanlioglu Architects Melkan Gursel & Murat Tabanlioglu/ Project: Dakar Congress Center Steven Holl Architects with JMArchitects Project: Seona Reid Building – Glasgow School of Art
 Best Sustainable Development of the Year: Kaunitz Yeung Architecture/ Project: Wanarn Clinic Henning Larsen Architects, Campus Kolding, SDU, University of Southern Denmark
 Best Future Building of the Year – Drawing Board: Sanjay Puri Architects/ Project: Reservoir 3TI Progetti Spa – 3TI LAB Srl/ Project: Civic Centre
 Best Future Building of the Year – Under Construction: Andrew Bromberg of Aedas/ Project: The West Kowloon Terminus under the Hong Kong Section of the Express Rail Link/ project
 Urban Design of the Year: Henning Larsen Architects and Tredje Natur/ Project: Vinge Train Station
 Best Façade Design and Engineering of the Year: Logon Architecture/ Project: Shanghai Museum of Glass
 Developer of the Year: Battersea Power Station/ Project: Battersea Power Station
 Lifetime Achievement Winner: Moshe Safdie
 Overall Winner: Hiroshi Nakamura & NAP Co. Ltd/ Project: Ribbon Chapel

2011
The category winners in 2011 were:
 Mixed Use Building: Todd Architects for The Boat
 Residential Building (Multiple Occupancy): OBR Open Building Research S.r.l. for Milanofiori Residential Complex
 Residential Building (Single Occupancy): Studio mk27 for Punta House
 Commercial Building: Estudi Massip-Bosch Arquitectes for Diagonal Zero Zero Telefonica Tower
 Public Building: Joint winners: Diaz & Diaz Arquitectos for Building of Control CCS and Steven Holl Architects for Cité de l'Océan et du Surf
 International Interior Design: RHWL Architects for St. Pancras Renaissance London Hotel
 Master Planning & Landscaping: URBE Architects for Estoril Open Space Strategy
 Young Architect: dEMM arquitectura – Paulo Fernandes Silva for Living Foz Porto
 Structural Design: schmidt hammer lassen architects for The Crystal
 Best Sustainable Technology Incorporated into a Building: JSWD Architekten for Q1 Building, ThyssenKrupp Quarter
 Best Sustainable Development in Keeping with its Environment: LAN for EDF Archives Centre
 Overall winner: OBR Open Building Research S.r.l. for Milanofiori Residential Complex

2010
The category winners in 2010 were:
 Mixed Use Building: Feilden Clegg Bradley Studios for Broadcasting Place
 Residential Building (Multiple Occupancy): Henning Larsen Architects for The Wave
 Residential Building (Single Occupancy): Mount Fuji Architects Studio for PLUS
 Commercial Building: Hassel and Lend Lease design for ANZ Centre, Melbourne
 Public Building: Boogertman + Partners & Populous for Soccer City National Stadium
 International Interior Design: Isay Weinfeld Arquitetura for Bar Número
 Master Planning & Landscaping: URBE Architects for Estoril Open Space Strategy
 Young Architect: Arquitecturia for Ferreries Cultural Centre
 Structural Design: Skidmore, Owings and Merrill for Burj Khalifa
 Sustainable Development: Ben Nakamura for Nanasawa Kibonooka Elementary School

2009
The category winners in 2009 were:
 Mixed-Use Building: EAA-Emre Arolat Architects for 7800 Çe?me Residences & Hotel
 Residential Building: David Chipperfield Architects for Ninetree Village
 Residential Building: Studio mk27 for Paraty House
 Commercial Building: Woods Bagot for Qatar Science & Technology Park
 Public Building: GPY arquitectos for La Cisnera Community Centre
 International Interior Design: Atelier Brückner GmbH for BMW Museum
 Master Planning & Landscaping: Strootman Landscape Architects & Palmbout Urban Landscapes for Wieringen Passage
 Young Architect: John Pardey Architects for Hind House 
 Best Sustainable Development: Chetwoods Architects for Blue Planet, Chatterley Valley
 Structural Design: Amanda Levete Architects for Spencer Dock Bridge
 Grand Prix Winner Winner: Woods Bagot for Qatar Science & Technology Park

2008
Category winners in 2008 were:
 Mixed-Use Building of the Year: schmidt hammer lassen for Performers House
 Residential Building (single storey): bgp arquitectura for Black House
 Residential Building (multi storey): PCKO Architects for eScape
 Commercial Building (public): Kengo Kuma & Associates for Suntory Museum of Art
 Commercial Building (business): John McAslan & Partners for 28 Dorset Square
 International Interior Design: Skidmore, Owings and Merrill for GSC Offices
 Young Architect: Xavier Vilalta for Arreletes Day-Care Centre
 Sustainable Development: LSI Architects LLP for Cley Marshes Visitor Centre
 New Innovation: WSP Architectural Design Consulting for Long Shan Church
 Best Structural Design: Foster and Partners for Beijing International Airport Terminal
 Grand Prix: schmidt hammer lassen for Performers House

2007
The category winners in 2007 were:
 Environmentally Sustainable Building: Design Engine Architects for British Embassy, Sana'a
 International Interior Design: Woods Bagot for First Lounge
 New Build (built):  Steven Holl Architects for Nelson-Atkins Museum of Art
 New Build (in design): Skidmore, Owings and Merrill for ARB Bank
 Structural Design: Arup Associates for Kensington Oval
 Public Building: Haworth Tompkins for Young Vic
 Public Building (in design): PTW Architects for Beijing National Aquatics Center
 Material Supplier to the Architectural Industry: EH Smith for Sir John Lyon House
 Young Architect: Estudio Barozzi Veiga SL for Ribera del Duero Wine HQ
  International Building: Ryuichi Ashizawa Architects and Associates for Setre Chapel
 Overall Winner: Skidmore, Owings and Merrill for ARB Bank

2006
The category winners in 2006 were:
 New Build: 3XN Architects for Muziekgebouw
 Environmentally Sustainable Project: Farrells for The Green Building
 Public Building: Raymond Moriyama and Griffiths Rankin Cook Architects for Canadian War Museum
 Regeneration Project: David Chipperfield for Des Moines Public Library
 Structural Design: Zaha Hadid Architects for Phaeno Science Center
 Use of Innovative Technology and Thoughtful Design (Small Scheme): Litracon Light Transmitting Concrete
 Use of Technology (Large Scheme): Bahrain World Trade Centre
 International Interior Design: Stephonson Bell's  for AstraZeneca
 Overall Winner: David Chipperfield for America's Cup Building

2005
The category winners in 2005 were:
 New Build: Henning Larsen Architects for IT University of Copenhagen
 Environmentally Sustainable Project: Auer+Weber+Assoziierte for SolarCity Centre
 Public Building: Farrells for Home Office Headquarters
 Regeneration Project: Tillner & Partner Zt GmbH for Vienna Gürtel
 Structural Design: BRT Architekten for Dockland Office Building
 Use of Innovative Technology and Thoughtful Design (Small Scheme): BEHF Architects for Fabios Restaurant Façade
 Use of Technology (large Scheme): Alsop for Queen Mary College, Institute of Cell and Molecular Science
 International Renovation/Interior Design: Aviaplan for IT Fornebu
 Most Promising Technology for the Architectural Industry: Rieder Smart Elements GmbH for Central Park: Urban Elements
 Overall Winner: Henning Larsen Architects for IT University of Copenhagen

See also
 List of architecture prizes

References

External links
 LEAF Awards Official Site
 LEAF International
 LEAF Awards on DesignBuild Website

Architecture awards
Awards established in 2005